Hugh Amherst, 4th Earl Amherst (30 January 1856 – 7 March 1927) was a British peer, who succeeded to the earldom and its associated titles upon the death of his brother William in 1910. Amherst joined the Coldstream Guards in 1875, served in the Nile campaigns from 1884–1885 and became a captain in 1887. In 1896 he married Eleanor Clementina St. Aubyn. He lived at Montreal Park near Sevenoaks in Kent.

In 1911 he was one of the 114 peers who voted against the passing of the Parliament Act 1911.

References

External links

1856 births
1927 deaths
Coldstream Guards officers
Earls Amherst
People from Sevenoaks